Stachytarpheta urticifolia, the nettleleaf velvetberry, is a species of lavender plant in the verbena family. In some countries it is considered as an invasive weed.

References

External links

urticifolia